Schonungen is a municipality  in the Schweinfurt district, Bavaria, Germany. The villages in this municipality are:
Schonungen
Forst (Unterfranken)
Abersfeld
Mainberg
Hausen
Marktsteinach
Loeffelsterz
Reichmannshausen
and some more

References

External links
 

Schweinfurt (district)